The men's team sprint competition of the cycling events at the 2015 Pan American Games was held on July 16 at the Milton Velodrome in Milton, Ontario.

Schedule
All times are Eastern Standard Time (UTC-3).

Results

Qualification

Finals

Bronze Medal Race

Gold Medal Race

References

Track cycling at the 2015 Pan American Games
Men's team sprint (track cycling)